Cycling in London is a popular mode of transport and leisure activity within the capital city of the United Kingdom. Following a national decline in the 1960s of levels of utility cycling, cycling as a mode of everyday transport within London began a slow regrowth in the 1970s. This continued until the beginning of the 21st century, when levels began to increase significantly - during the period from 2000 to 2012, the number of daily journeys made by bicycle in Greater London doubled to 580,000. The growth in cycling can partly be attributed to the launch in 2010 by Transport for London (TfL) of a cycle hire system throughout the city's centre. By 2013, the scheme was attracting a monthly ridership of approximately 500,000, peaking at a million rides in July of that year. Health impact analyses have shown that London would benefit more from increased cycling and cycling infrastructure than other European cities.

Cycling conditions in the city have in recent years been perceived as unsafe by cyclists. A spate of cycling deaths in London occurred in November 2013, drawing criticism of TfL's cycle facilities and sparking protests and calls for safety improvements from politicians, cycling organisations and the media, as well as differing views on the extent to which poor cycling contributes to safety risks for both cyclists and other road users.

History

19th century

The popularity of cycling during the 19th century is in itself cyclical, consisting of several short periods of bicycle booms followed by a sharp decline in popularity.

Bicycles first made their way to London in 1818 via the carriage maker Denis Johnson, having imported and improved upon the original design by Karl von Drais, from which they acquired the name draisine, though its popularity among predominantly young male members of the aristocracy quickly gathered it the nickname 'dandy horse'. These designs lacked the pedals common to modern bicycles and were instead propelled by the action of the rider's feet on the ground. While briefly popular in the following years, slopes were challenging both to climb and descend, and riders were widely mocked in the streets and newspapers while the London College of Surgeons condemned the practice of cycling as dangerous. Its popularity soon fell out of fashion. In the following years a number of designs were proposed, tested, and built, attempting to remedy the drawbacks of the design, including tricycles and quadricycles, or the tandem bicycle. None gained widespread popularity.

It was not until the invention of the first 'true bicycles' in the 1860s, powered by the action of the rider's feet on two pedals driving a single wheel, did cycling gain significant popularity again. Originally called velocipedes, the lack of suspension, rough Victorian roads, and metal-rimmed tyres soon gathered them the nickname 'boneshakers'.

A further development was to move the rider directly above the forward wheel, allowing the rider to fully extend their leg with each cycle and thus deliver the most power, resulting in the ordinary bicycle, more commonly known as the penny farthing. However this made the machine dangerously unstable - in the event of an upset, the rider would likely be thrown forward over the handlebars. Consequently, its popularity lay predominantly among young middle and upper-class men who were more accepting of the risks. Older men, and women of all ages, preferred safer designs such as the tricycle, but the high cost conferred by the additional mechanical complexity meant that such machines were rarely seen. Among those who did ride, cycling developed as both a recreational and social activity, particularly among middle and upper class townsfolk taking advantage of their new machines to enjoy day trips through the nearby countryside. The village of Ripley, lying on the popular London to Winchester route, was declared "the Mecca of all good cyclists". Other popular destinations included Thames Ditton and Box Hill,.

Some riders joined one of the many cycling clubs formed in this period. Club members would often ride together on shared excursions, often behind a recognised club Captain and his Lieutenants, with orders given by the club bugler or by whistle. Membership of such clubs could be exclusive, and the distinctive club uniforms conferred social opportunities even as a lone rider at the many rest stops.

The first recognisably modern bicycle, with equal-sized wheels and pedals driving the rear wheel via a chain mechanism, was the Rover safety bicycle of 1885. The invention of the pneumatic tyre in 1888 and the associated ride quality improvements only added to its popularity, triggering the third great bike boom which would last through the 1890s. First Battersea Park and then Hyde Park were popular with new cyclists seeking a space to learn to ride.

The introduction of the drop-frame bicycle in 1889, based on the design of the safety but without the crossbar between the rider's legs, allowed women to ride comfortably for the first time while wearing the long skirts typical of Victorian fashion. Cycling was one of the few activities a woman could take part in without a male chaperone, and while the bicycle changed how men took part in the same activities they had previously, for women the bicycle provided new opportunities and access to activities previously closed off to them, and from the image of women on bicycles enjoying their newfound freedom of movement outside the immediate proximity to the home emerged the image of the new woman. Several prominent feminist writers commented on the freedom the bicycle provided women and advocated others to take up riding. Susan Hamilton, Countess of Malmesbury, pronounced the sport "one of the greatest blessings given to modern women", and John Galsworthy would write the bicycle had "been responsible for more movement in manners and morals than anything since Charles the Second". Such changes did not come without significant pushback from more traditionalist factions. The female cyclist was seen as violating the separate spheres ideology prevalent at the time, and accused of attempting to become a man. Opposition ranged from satirical caricatures in the newspapers, to poor service provided at inns and cafes, to verbal and in some cases physical abuse directed at riders, including an instance of a meat hook thrown at a rider in Kilburn. Particular attention was directed towards riders dressed in rational dress, who rejected the traditional long skirts and corsets typical of Victorian women's fashion in favour of bloomers and other more practical forms of clothing especially suited to cycling. Despite the opposition, women continued to ride, with one in three bicycles ordered in 1895 placed by women.

20th century
London's first segregated cycle track was introduced in 1934, between Hanger Lane and Greenford. Although the facility was well-used for cycling, segregation was opposed by cycling organisations at the time, fearing loss of rights to ride on the highway.

Beginning in the 1960s, Britain experienced a decline in levels of utility cycling due to the increasing wealth of its populace and greater affordability of motor vehicles; this in turn led to the favouring of vehicular traffic over other options by transportation planners. In 1977, the Conservative Party won the Greater London Council (GLC) election, and enacted policies that deprioritised spending on public transport.

In 1980 Ken Livingstone, at the time the Labour Party's transport spokesperson, made a promise to the London Cycling Campaign (LCC) that should Labour take control of the GLC they would spend more on the needs of cyclists. In May 1981, Labour won the GLC election, with Livingstone becoming GLC leader shortly afterwards. The following month, Livingstone announced that the GLC would accede to the LCC's demands, creating a cycling planning unit and spending at least 1% of the yearly transport budget, £2m, on cycling.

21st century

In 2000, Livingstone became the first elected Mayor of London, and in 2008 set a target of a 400% increase in cycling between 2008 and 2025. On 9 February 2008 Livingstone announced an estimated £400 million of initiatives to improve and increase cycling and walking, including thousands of new bike parking facilities at railway and tube stations. To be co-ordinated by the TfL and London boroughs, the aims include having one in ten Londoners making a round trip by bike each day and five per cent of all daily trips by bike by 2025.

In 2011 around 2.5 per cent of all commutes to work in London were by bike, though the figure was as high as 9% in Hackney. This compared to other cities in the United Kingdom such as Cardiff (4.3 per cent), York (18 per cent) and Cambridge (28 per cent of commutes) and to cities in mainland Europe such as Berlin (13 per cent), Munich (15 per cent), and  Amsterdam (37 per cent of all journeys). The amount of growth has varied between regions within the city; on some routes such as Cheapside cyclists have been reported to comprise over half of rush-hour traffic.

Plans to construct twelve "Cycle Superhighway" routes were announced by Livingstone in 2008, connecting inner and outer London, as well as providing cycle zones around urban centres. Livingstone lost the subsequent mayoral election to Conservative Boris Johnson in May 2008, and the new mayor promised to continue to support cycling.

Two pilot routes were implemented in July 2010, with Cycle Superhighway 3 (CS3) connecting Barking in East London with Tower Hill on the eastern perimeter of The City of London and Cycle Superhighway 7 (CS7) linking Colliers Wood in South London to Bank in the city. CS7 was criticised by rival cycling commentators and campaigners for relying on "blue paint" and bus lanes to protect cyclists from motor traffic, without using kerbed cycle tracks. CS3 was more popular, although critics argued that much of it had existed already, and had simply been rebranded as a Superhighway. Campaigners argued that the Mayor's rhetoric prior to launch had promised a much higher standard of cycling facility, yet the Superhighways encouraged cyclists on to busy main roads in conflict with buses and other motor traffic, with significant risk of being hit by left-turning vehicles at major junctions.

In July 2010, 6,000 bicycles became available for short-term rental from TfL under the Barclays Cycle Hire at 400 docking stations in nine central London boroughs. This was later expanded to 8,000 cycles from 570 stations, and is now branded Santander Cycles. The scheme, run by Montreal-based PBSC Urban Solutions, initially covered about 17 square miles (44 square kilometres). There is a charge for hire, although there was an initial period of free use to promote the scheme. The scheme was designed based on a feasibility study produced by German Dector-Vega and Charles Snead in November 2008.

Over the next few years, pressure from campaign groups, bloggers and everyday cyclists using social media and on-street demonstrations brought the state of London's roads for cycling to the attention of the media. Eventually, this led to significant new investment in safer cycle infrastructure for London. In March 2013, City Hall announced £1 billion of improvements to make cycling safer and easier in London, as well as to improve air pollution and inner city congestion in the capital. Boris Johnson, Livingstone's replacement as Mayor of London, planned to build a 15-mile "Crossrail for bikes" running from the West London suburbs across the Westway, through Hyde Park, the Mall and along the Victoria Embankment past Canary Wharf and into East London.

In March 2013 "The Mayor's Vision for Cycling in London" was announced, a plan which includes a "Crossrail for bikes" running a fully segregated route from east to west across London to be in place by 2016. The statement also announced a Central London "bike grid" which would join up and improve existing cycle routes in Zone 1, as well as a network of "Quietways" in outer London, and E-bikes for rent in hilly areas of the city. The London Cycle Hire Scheme has been described by the deputy mayor as "oozing" out over London with expansion in 2014 in Hackney, Notting Hill, Hammersmith, Fulham and Wandsworth.

In December 2013, TfL published a draft map of a "Central London Grid" of new cycle routes.

In February 2017 Kingston upon Thames London Borough Council agreed to set up a social prescribing trial as part of the Go Cycle campaign, in which GPs, physiotherapists and mental health professionals can refer patients for a free 12-week course with professional cycle coaches and qualified instructors.

The Obike dockless hire scheme launched in London in July 2017 followed by introduction of the Lime and Uber e-bike schemes.

Facilities

Cycle lanes and paths 

On-road cycle lanes vary. Some have raised concrete kerbs that separate people cycling from other traffic, whilst others are defined by lines painted on the road surface. The first Cycle Superhighways went into use in May 2010, and the first Quietways in 2016.

Cycle paths include routes through the royal parks (St. James's Park, Hyde Park, Regent's Park and Green Park), along the Thames Path and London's canals and waterways. There is a behavioural code for considerate riding on London's towpaths.

On public transport 

Folding bicycles may be carried on almost all public transport in London. Full-size bicycles may be carried on some sections of the transport network during certain hours of the day. Bicycle parking facilities, generally cycle stands, but in some cases more secure facilities, are available at many stations.

Safety 

Many roads in London are lined with guardrail, and cyclist deaths have occurred when motor vehicles crushed people against the rail as they cycled. In 2007, TfL set a policy of the use of guardrail only in locations where it has been proven to be a requirement for safety, and began a programme of removing it where possible.

In 2008 Ken Livingstone announced that councils would be able to set borough-wide  limits without a requirement for special enforcement measures. Islington and Southwark subsequently imposed borough-wide 20 mph zones, with Camden announcing plans to introduce the same system in 2012. The City of London imposed a borough-wide 20 mph limit in July 2014. Such zones are backed by cycling groups, who support traffic speed restrictions for both encouraging walking and cycling, and making them safer.

In January 2013 Boris Johnson appointed London's first Cycling Commissioner, tasked with making it a safer and more popular mode of transport in the capital, and announced that segregated cycle facilities would be built across London as part of a package of measures designed to improve cyclist safety.

In June 2013 TfL announced the creation of a "Safe Streets for London" plan. The plan aims to cut road deaths by 40% by 2020 via a range of measures, including redesigning "critical" major junctions and streets, installing more and upgrading existing traffic enforcement cameras, working with London boroughs to implement more 20 mph speed limit zones, modifying heavy goods vehicles with safety equipment, and offering cycle training to every school pupil in London.

Later the same year, it was claimed that half of cyclists still routinely ignored red stop lights at typical junctions in London, with the Licensed Taxi Drivers Association releasing two-hour-long rush hour videos that they said backed up drivers' daily experience that cyclists illegally using the pavement, running red lights or weaving in and out of vehicles, were not a small minority. The London Cycling Campaign said that police figures indicated far more of cyclists' accidents were caused by poor driving than by ignoring red lights, although a survey indicated that more than half of cyclists admitted ignoring a red light at least once.

The following year the London Cycling Campaign participated in a safety initiative with the Guide Dogs charity stressing that cyclists have a duty of care to be considerate to other road users, and pedestrians in particular, after the charity found that one in four blind and partially-sighted people in London had been hit by a cyclist, and seven in ten suffered a near miss, with cyclists commonly riding on pavements at speed or running red lights.

Statistics 
The number of daily bicycle journeys in London has increased by 170% since the 1990s, from 270,000 daily journeys in 1993 to 730,000 in 2016.

A study of deaths of cyclists in London published in 2010 in the research journal BMC Public Health stated that "the biggest threat [to cyclists] remains freight vehicles, involved in more than 4 out of 10 incidents, with over half turning left at the time of the crash."

2013 deaths 

In November 2013, six cyclists were killed on London streets within a two-week period, bringing the number of cyclists killed in London in the year to 14, nine of which involved a heavy goods vehicle (HGV). In response, the Metropolitan Police announced an initiative called Operation Safeway, in which 2,500 traffic police were stationed at major junctions throughout the city to issue fixed penalty notices to road users breaking road traffic laws and offer advice to vulnerable road users. Following the deaths, Boris Johnson stated in an interview on BBC Radio that cyclists were endangering their lives when not following road traffic laws, making it "very difficult for the traffic engineers to second-guess [their actions]". The comments were immediately condemned as "deflecting blame onto cyclists [and] grossly insensitive" by Roger Geffen, campaigns and policy director of the Cyclists' Touring Club, and as "dodging responsibility" and "an insult to the dead and injured" by Darren Johnson, the Green Party member of the London Assembly. Former Olympic cyclist Chris Boardman, policy director for British Cycling, the national governing body for cycle racing in Great Britain, called on Johnson to ban HGVs from some London roads during peak hours, saying that Johnson had made a verbal promise to him "to look at the successful experiences of Paris and many other cities in restricting the movements of heavy vehicles during peak hours". Johnson stated in a radio interview that he was unconvinced by the idea, but was however considering banning cyclists from wearing headphones while riding. However, the traffic division of the Metropolitan Police were unable to identify any serious cycling incidents in which headphone use could be identified as a contributing factor.

Two weeks after the sixth death, a protest campaign organised via social media held a die-in - modelled on the Dutch "Stop de Kindermoord" pro-cycling demonstrations of the 1970s — outside the headquarters of TfL, in which over 1,000 cyclists lay silently in the road and held a vigil for cyclists and pedestrians killed by road traffic.

A BBC poll taken in December 2013 found that one fifth of regular cycle commuters had stopped cycling to work as a result of the recent spate of deaths. A fifth of the survey respondents had also been involved in a collision, and 68% believed that London's roads were not safe to cycle on.

Regular events 

 RideLondon (formally Mayor of London's Sky Ride): an annual event launched as London Freewheel in September 2007, for which certain roads in central London are closed to motor vehicles for several hours on a Sunday. On 10 August 2012 it was announced that the 2013 Skyride would be re-branded as 'RideLondon', a two-day 'World-class festival of cycling'. The event incorporates an 8-mile 'FreeCycle' event, 'Aimed at cyclists of all ages and abilities' on closed roads, as well as a 100-mile ride and a 'Grand Prix' event for professional cyclists.
 Critical Mass, which leaves the National Film Theatre on the South Bank around 7.00pm on the last Friday of each month

 World Naked Bike Ride, held annually in 70 cities in 20 countries, including London every June since 2004,
 Bike Week, an annual UK celebration of cycling with many local events in June
 London to Brighton ride for charity each summer; about 30,000 cyclists take part
 London to Paris rides for various charities
 Dunwich Dynamo, annual midsummer overnight ride to Suffolk since 1993
 London Cycling Awards: the London Cycling Campaign celebrates some of the best improvements for cyclists each year with the London Cycling Awards. 2008 winners included cycle parking at Frampton Park Estate in Hackney and at Shadwell DLR station; Kingston Council and Metropolitan Police for the Recycling Bikes Back into The Community scheme; Newham University Hospital NHS Trust for the Well at Work project; STA Bikes and Hackney Council for Family Cycle Clubs; and Jenny Jones for services to cycling.
 The Tweed Run, an annual ride inaugurated in 2009 where the participants recreate the early years of British cycling by wearing tweed and other period clothing and by riding vintage bicycles.

Notes

References

Citations

News

Reports and data

Announcements

Other

External links

General information on London cycling
 The Mayor's Vision for Cycling in London (March 2013)
 Transport for London's cycling pages
 Cycle guides and maps
 Cycle journey planner
 London CycleStreets map and journey planner

Organisations
 London Cycling Campaign
 Central London CTC, the local branch of Cyclists' Touring Club, a charitable membership organization supporting cyclists and promoting bicycle use

Safety information
 Driving and cycling safety tips from Transport for London
 Road safety fact sheets, reports and data from Transport for London's London Road Safety Unit
 Cycling in London: Severe crashes 2006-2014 (Google Maps custom map)
 Cycling in London: Severe crashes 2006-2014 (Google Docs spreadsheet)

History
 Cycling for London (on YouTube; 24 minutes), a film produced by the Greater London Council in 1984 to show improvements made by their Cycling Unit to cycling facilities in London

 
London